The Tarikh-i Qum ("History of Qum") is a book about the history of the city of Qom, written by Hasan ibn Muhammad Qumi, in Arabic, in 988. The original work is now lost, but a 15th-century Persian translation by Hasan ibn Ali Qumi has been preserved.

During the Middle Ages, many Iranian cities (such as Qom) had their own local history books written about them, but most of them have been lost. The ones that remain focus mostly on the religious matters, rather than the history of the city. The Tarikh-i Qum notably focuses on the latter.

Details regarding the life of Hasan ibn Muhammad Qumi are obscure. Of Arab origin, he was a descendant of the Ash'ari that had once ruled Qom. The sources that he based on his work on implies that he was a local Shi'ite scholar, and thus most likely one of the first Shi'ite historians in Iran whose work has been preserved. It was during the term of his brother Abu'l-Qasim Ali ibn Muhammad Katib as tax collector (appointed in 963), when Hasan accumulated most of his sources. In his work, Hasan does not mention any trips outside Qom to collect books, but he does mention the people he were in correspondence with, which includes the Buyid vizier Sahib ibn Abbad (died 995), to whom he dedicated his Tarikh-i Qum to. Hasan wrote his work in the same style as that of the now lost history of Isfahan by Hamza al-Isfahani (died after 961).

References

Sources 
 

Iranian books
10th-century history books
History books about Iran
Qom
10th-century Arabic books
Persian-language books